Mikhail Yevgenyevich Beschastnykh (born 1 April 1974) is a former Russian footballer who played as a midfielder or forward.

Playing career
He made his debut in the Russian Premier League in 1995 for FC Lokomotiv Nizhny Novgorod.

Personal life
He is an identical twin brother of Vladimir Beschastnykh, a former Russian international player.

References

Russian footballers
FC Lokomotiv Nizhny Novgorod players
Russian Premier League players
FC Dynamo Stavropol players
FC Shinnik Yaroslavl players
FK Ventspils players
FC Rubin Kazan players
Russian twins
Russian expatriate footballers
Expatriate footballers in Latvia
1974 births
Living people
FC Metallurg Lipetsk players
Russian expatriate sportspeople in Latvia
Twin sportspeople
Footballers from Moscow
Association football midfielders
FC Spartak Moscow players
FC Olimp-Dolgoprudny players